"Change of life" is a phrase that may refer to:

 Menopause, a life stage in women
 "Change of Life", the Eureka Seven episode, Change of Life (Eureka Seven)
 "Change of Life", the Goodies episode, Change of Life (The Goodies)